Bonnie Kathaleen Land (died 7 October 2012) was a computer and mathematician at NASA's Langley facility. The term "computer" was a job title identifying people who performed mathematical calculations by hand, i.e. "human computers". The 2016 movie Hidden Figures, which brought awareness to this early success within the NASA space program, was written by Land's former Sunday school student, and Land served as one of the first interviewees during research for the film. Land was called the "inspiration behind, catalyst for, and gateway to" the creation of Hidden Figures.

She was married to Stanley Land and had three daughters. She died on 7 October 2012.

Further reading

References 

20th-century American mathematicians
American women mathematicians
NASA people
Human computers
2012 deaths
20th-century American women
21st-century American women